Run Papa Run is a 2008 Hong Kong comedy-drama film directed and co-written by Sylvia Chang, and based on a novel by Benny Li. The film stars Louis Koo as Tiger Lee, a Triad boss who struggles to hide his criminal lifestyle when he is faced with raising his daughter.

Cast
 Louis Koo as Tiger Lee Tin-yun
 Chan Ka-wo as Young Tiger Lee
 Rene Liu as Mabel Chan
 Nora Miao as Auntie Ying
 Liu Yihan as Lee Hei-yee
 Monica Lam as 1 year-old Lee Hoi-yee
 Wong Wai-lam as 5 year-old Lee Hoi-yee
 Wong Wai-ching as 10 year-old Lee Hoi-yee
 Max Mok as Big Eyes
 Lam Suet as Big Mouth
 Derek Tsang as Chicken
 Conroy Chan as Big Head
 Guo Jingling as Officer Lau
 Ti Lung as Mabel's father
 Amy To as Mabel's mother
 Shaun Tam as Ken/Peter Lau
 Au Wai-lun as Young Peter Lau
 Michael Chan as Uncle Tak
 Kent Cheng as Uncle Lone
 Siu Yam-yam as Madam Si
 Gladys Fung as Sue
 Louis Wong as Uncle Kwai
 Fruit Chan as Priest
 Lau Shau-ching as Priest
 Ken Lo as Kong
 Lam Wah-chuen as Mr. Doun
 Wong Pak-to as Four Eyes in Hair Salon
 Cheung Ping-chuen as 70s gangster
 Tsang Chin-yau as 70s gangster
 Heung Ming-hiu as 70s gangster
 Sammy Sum as Tiger's bodyguard
 Altan Au as Tiger's bodyguard
 Fong Chi-kui as Big head's bodyguard
 Wong Chi-wang as Big Head's bodyguard
 Martin Ma as Big Head's bodyguard
 Jason Yip as Cram school instructor #1
 Michelle Wong as Cram school instructor #1
 Law Chi-leung as Cram school instructor #1
 Chan Wai-kwong as Doctor
 Eddy Law as Plainclothes detective #1
 Law Yun-yau as Plainclothes detective #2
 Victy Wong as Tiger's syndicate colleague
 Rocky Wong as Tiger's syndicate colleague
 Alan Jim as Tiger's syndicate colleague
 Mo Chun-yu as Big Head's son
 Cheung Ka-yan as Shirley Lau
 Choemanree Kraisorn as Thai drug trafficker
 Ng Pok-yee as Thai drug trafficker
 Ivy Lau as Kindergarten teacher
 Chan Sze-wai as Kindergarten student
 Lau Pik-ka as Kindergarten student
 Huang Kai-sen as Boss of rival gang
 Coco Cheung as Big Mouth's female escort
 Ng Hau-yiu as Big Head's female escort
 Cheung Siu-lun as Boy in hospital
 Brian R. Barrons as Priest
 Chan Sze-kit as Church organist

Awards and nominations

References

External links
 

2008 films
2008 comedy-drama films
Hong Kong comedy-drama films
Triad films
2000s Cantonese-language films
Films directed by Sylvia Chang
Films based on Chinese novels
Films set in Hong Kong
Films shot in Hong Kong
Films with screenplays by Susan Chan
2008 comedy films
2008 drama films
2000s Hong Kong films